Khabar Arkhi (also Romanized as Khabar Arkhī; also known as Khabar Aikhe and Peykān) is a village in Ali Sadr Rural District, Gol Tappeh District, Kabudarahang County, Hamadan Province, Iran. At the 2006 census, its population was 949, in 188 families.

References 

Populated places in Kabudarahang County